Stier:

 means "bull"

 Elizabeth Fleming Stier, American food scientist & author 
 Alfons Stier (1877–1952), German composer; (de)
 Christoph Stier (born 1941), Lutheran bishop; (de)
 Davor Ivo Stier (born 1972), Croatian politician
 Ernst Stier (1877–??), German manor owner, politician; (de)
 Fridolin Stier (1902–1981), Catholic theologian; (de)
 Fritz Stier-Somlo (1873–1932), Hungarian-Austrian lawyer; (de)
 Gothart Stier (born 1938), German conductor; (de)
 Hans-Martin Stier (born 1950), German actor, singer; (de)
 Hubert Stier (1838–1907), German architect; (de)
 Marco Stier (born 1984), a German footballer
 Rudolf Ewald Stier (1800–1862), a German Protestant churchman, mystic
 Norbert Stier (born 1953), German general
 Wilhelm Stier (1799-1856), German architect

See also 
 Ochs (surname)
 Ochsner
 Oxman

German-language surnames
Jewish surnames

de:Stier